The George P. Mayer Boathouse is located in Three Lakes, Wisconsin, United States. It was added to the National Register of Historic Places in 2011.

Description
The boathouse is two stories tall with a hip roof. Boat slips are located on the first floor with entertaining and living spaces located on the second floor.

References

Boathouses in the United States
Buildings and structures in Oneida County, Wisconsin
National Register of Historic Places in Oneida County, Wisconsin
Boathouses on the National Register of Historic Places in Wisconsin